Kora is a town in central Ethiopia. It is one of a number of populated places in the country with this name.

Transport
The town is served by a station on the Ethio-Djibouti Railways.

See also
Railway stations in Ethiopia

References
Kora

Populated places in the Oromia Region